Robert Cobbley (fl. 1391–1399), of Exeter, Devon, was an English politician.

He was a Member (MP) of the Parliament of England for Barnstaple in 1391 and for Exeter in 1393 and 1399.

References

Year of birth missing
Year of death missing
Members of the Parliament of England (pre-1707) for Exeter
English MPs 1391
English MPs 1393
English MPs 1399
Members of the Parliament of England (pre-1707) for Barnstaple